Roberta Linn (born April 30, 1931, in Gravity, Iowa) is an American singer and entertainer. She is most associated with the Rat Pack and the Las Vegas Strip, where she was a regular performer with Freddie Bell and the Bellboys in the 1950s and 1960s. From 1949 to 1954, she sang with the Lawrence Welk group, "The Champagne Ladies".

Biography

Linn worked in films as a child actress; among the films she had roles in are Little Miss Marker and the Our Gang comedies.  As Linn grew up, she found there were no film roles for her or many other former child performers.  She became a vocalist and was a successful performer with many big bands.

Linn performed as part of "The Champagne Ladies" of Lawrence Welk from 1949 to 1954, replacing Helen Ramsay, and performing with Lois Best, Norma Zimmer and Jayne Walton. She often appeared in the early 1950s at the Aragon Ballroom of Santa Monica, and had her own Emmy-winning show on KTLA called "Cafe Continental" or "The Gypsy", which she left in 1954. In 1951, Linn was hired by Columbia Pictures to dub for songs such sung by Charlotte Austin in the film Castle in the Air (1952), originally titled Rainbow 'Round My Shoulder. At the time, Linn was known for songs such as "Wonderful, Wasn't It?" "Oh, Promise Me" and "Ain't Misbehavin'. A 1955 article wrote: "Roberta Linn expends enough energy to do an atomic reactor proud in her Terrace Room opening and draws plaudits from the crowd as a reward", noting how she "bounced" around the stage and praising her rendition of "Love is a Many Splendored Thing". In August 1954 she signed a record deal with Ekko Records. Linn also became the vocalist on a KNX Radio program in August 1954.  The radio show, "Matinee", was aired on weekday afternoons.

Linn became a regular performer with Freddie Bell and the Bellboys,  being a performer at Sands Hotel and Casino, the Sahara Hotel, the Desert Inn, and other Las Vegas hotels in the 1950s and 1960s. She became associated with Frank Sinatra, who was a good friend,  and the Rat Pack. She also performed in Vegas with Chicago mobster Johnny Marshall, before he was evicted, Linn also appeared in the lounge of Frank Sinatra's hotel on the California-Nevada border, Cal Neva Lodge & Casino. In 1964 she appeared on The Joey Bishop Show and in the film Get Yourself a College Girl, and recorded the album "The Bells Are Swinging" with Freddie Bell. She was married to Bell from 1961 to 1973. There is a large photograph with Linn as a Champagne Lady on display at the Lawrence Welk Museum in Escondido, California.

References

Further reading

External links
 

American women singers
1931 births
Living people
Keen Records artists
People from Taylor County, Iowa
21st-century American women